Sou Yaty (born 17 December 1991) is a Cambodian footballer, who plays as a goalkeeper. He currently plays for Nagaworld.

Career
The goalkeeper played previously for National Defense Ministry. He signed in summer 2011 for Army Division of Logistics FC.

International
He made his senior debut in a friendly match against the Philippines on 5 September 2012. The game ended in a scoreless draw.

Honours

Club
National Defense Ministry
 Hun Sen Cup: 2010
Phnom Penh Crown
 Cambodian League: 2014
 2014 Mekong Club Championship: Third place
Boeung Ket
 Cambodian League: 2016, 2017
 2015 Mekong Club Championship: Runner up
Nagaworld FC
 Cambodian League: 2018

Individual
 Cambodian League Golden gloves: 2014
 Cambodian League Golden gloves: 2017
 2015 Mekong Club Championship: Goal Keeper of tourment

References

External links
 

1991 births
Living people
Cambodian footballers
Cambodia international footballers
Association football goalkeepers
Phnom Penh Crown FC players
Boeung Ket Rubber Field players
Nagaworld FC players
Sportspeople from Phnom Penh